The 2013 Grand Prix de Futsal was the eighth edition of the international futsal competition of the same kind as the FIFA Futsal World Cup but with invited nations and held annually in Brazil. It was first held in 2005.

Participating

First round

Group A

Group B

Final round

Classification 7th–8th

Classification 5th–6th

Classification 1st–4th

7th place match

5th place match

Semifinal matches

3rd place match

Final

Final standing

References

External links
Official website

2013
2013 in Brazilian football
2013 in futsal